Cody Reichard (born February 18, 1987) is an American professional ice hockey goaltender who is currently an unrestricted free agent who most recently played for the Evansville Icemen of the ECHL.

Playing career
He played collegiate hockey with the Miami RedHawks in the Central Collegiate Hockey Association. During the 2012–13 season, Reichard appeared in 7 games for the Houston Aeros of the American Hockey League, on loan from the Stockton Thunder of the ECHL.

On August 21, 2013, Reichard's rights were traded by the Florida Everblades, to the Fort Wayne Komets.

On October 10, 2014, Reichard was traded from the Orlando Solar Bears to the Indy Fuel to begin the 2014–15 season.

On December 20, 2014, Reichard signed a professional try out with the Grand Rapids Griffins. Prior to signing a professional try out with the Griffins, Reichard appeared in 15 games with the Indy Fuel this season, compiling a 5–6–2 record, a 3.35 GAA and a 0.889 save percentage. On December 26, 2014, Reichard was returned to the Indy Fuel, following being loaned to the Griffins.

On January 6, 2015, Reichard along with Klarc Wilson was traded to the Stockton Thunder in exchange for goaltender Shane Owen.

Career statistics

Awards and achievements

References

External links

1988 births
American men's ice hockey goaltenders
Evansville IceMen players
Fort Wayne Komets players
Houston Aeros (1994–2013) players
Ice hockey players from Ohio
Indiana Ice players
Indy Fuel players
Iowa Wild players
Living people
Miami RedHawks men's ice hockey players
Orlando Solar Bears (ECHL) players
People from Celina, Ohio
Stockton Thunder players
Utah Grizzlies (ECHL) players
AHCA Division I men's ice hockey All-Americans